Martensen is a surname. Notable people with the surname include:

Hans Lassen Martensen (1808–1884), Danish Luterhan bishop and academic
Hans Ludvig Martensen (1927–2012), Danish Roman Catholic bishop
Robert Martensen (1947–2013), American physician, historian and writer

See also
Mortensen